David Stover (born December 13, 1979) is a former NASCAR driver.

He did a part-time schedule for MB Motorsports in 2003. He made his debut at the Memphis, starting 23rd and finishing 25th. He would earn his first career top-20 finish the next race at Milwaukee, finishing 18th. Stover's best run would come at Bristol, where he finished 15th. His best career start would come with a pair of 23rds. Four DNFs in the last five races, however, hindered his progress, and Chris Wimmer replaced him in 2004, and Stover has not raced since.

Motorsports career results

NASCAR
(key) (Bold - Pole position awarded by qualifying time. Italics - Pole position earned by points standings or practice time. * – Most laps led.)

Camping World Truck Series

External links
 

1979 births
Living people
Sportspeople from Independence, Missouri
NASCAR drivers